The Valea Mare is a river in Romania, left tributary of the Crișul Negru. It flows into the Crișul Negru in Șuncuiș.

References

Rivers of Romania
Rivers of Bihor County